Below is a list of National Amateur Boxing Middleweight Champions, also known as United States Amateur Champions,  along with the state or region which they represented.  The United States National Boxing Championships bestow the title of United States Amateur Champion on amateur boxers for winning the annual national amateur boxing tournament organized by USA Boxing, the national governing body for Olympic boxing and is the United States' member organization of the International Amateur Boxing Association (AIBA).  It is one of the four premier amateur boxing tournaments, the others being the National Golden Gloves Tournament, which crowns its own amateur middleweight champion, the Police Athletic League Tournament, and the United States Armed Forces Tournament, all sending champions to the US Olympic Trials. It is contested at 165lbs.

Winners
1888 - P. Cahill, S.A.A.C.
1889 - P. Cahill, S.A.A.C. and W.H. Stuckey, New York, New York
1890 - P. Cahill, S.A.A.C
1891 - W.H. Stuckey, New York, New York
1892 - Not Held
1893 - A. Black, PASC
1894 - O. Harney, New York, New York
1895 - M. Lewis, Pittsburgh, Pennsylvania
1896 - George Schwegler, NYAC
1897 - A. McIntosh, New York, New York
1898 - Not Held
1899 - A. McIntosh, New York, New York
1900 - W. Rodenbach, New York, New York
1901 - W. Rodenbach, New York, New York
1902 - W. Rodenbach, New York, New York
1903 - W. Rodenbach, New York, New York
1904 - W. Rodenbach, New York, New York
1905 - Charles Mayer, St. Georgia
1906 - Henry Ficke, San Francisco
1907 - W. McKinnon, St. Phillip's
1908 - Henry Hall, Boston, Massachusetts
1909 - Dan Sullivan, Cambridge, Massachusetts
1910 - William Beckman, New York, New York
1911 - Napoleon Boutellier, Boston, Massachusetts
1912 - Arthur Sheridan, Brooklyn, New York
1913 - William Barrett, New York, New York
1914 - William Barrett, New York, New York
1915 - Adolph Kaufman, New York, New York
1916 - Adolph Kaufman, New York, New York
1917 - Eugene Brosseau, Montreal, Quebec, Canada
1918 - Martin Burke, New Orleans, Louisiana
1919 - Sam Lagonia, New York, New York
1920 - Sam Lagonia, New York, New York
1921 - Sam Lagonia, New York, New York
1922 - William Antrobus, New York, New York
1923 - Homer Robertson, Pittsburgh, Pennsylvania
1924 - Ben Funk, Yale University
1925 - Clayton Frye, Los Angeles, California
1926 - Arthur Flynn, Lawrence, Massachusetts
1927 - Joseph Hanlon, New York, New York
1928 - Harry Henderson, Annapolis, Maryland
1929 - Ray Lopez, Watertown, Massachusetts
1930 - Ring Larson, Quincy, Massachusetts
1931 - Frank Fullam, New York, New York
1932 - Fred Caserio, Chicago, Illinois
1933 - Tom Chester, New York, New York
1934 - Fred Apostoli, San Francisco, California
1935 - Dave Clark, Detroit, Michigan
1936 - Jimmy Clark, Jamestown, New York
1937 - Ted Cerwin, Detroit, Michigan
1938 - Bradley Lewis, New York, New York
1939 - Ezzard Charles, Cincinnati, Ohio
1940 - Joey Maxim, Cleveland, Ohio
1941 - James Mulligan, Lowell, Massachusetts
1942 - Sampson Powell, Cleveland, Ohio
1943 - Sampson Powell, Cleveland, Ohio
1944 - Frank Sweeney, Washington, D.C.
1945 - Allen Faulkner, Buffalo, New York
1946 - Harold Anspach, Cherry Point, New York
1947 - Nick Ranieri, Chicago, Illinois
1948 - Raymond Bryan, New York, New York
1949 - Albert Raymond, Philadelphia, Pennsylvania
1950 - Wes Echols, Atwater, California
1951 - Thomas Nelson, Philadelphia, Pennsylvania
1952 - Floyd Patterson, New York, New York
1953 - Bryant Thompson, Philadelphia, Pennsylvania
1954 - Donald McCray, Roxbury, Massachusetts
1955 - Paul Wright, U.S. Air Force
1956 - Paul Wright, U.S. Air Force
1957 - Alex Ford, Youngstown, Ohio
1958 - José Torres, New York, New York
1959 - Jimmy McQueen, Elyria, Ohio
1960 - Leotis Martin, Toledo, Ohio
1961 - Leotis Martin, Toledo, Ohio
1962 - Richard Gosha, Chicago, Illinois
1963 - Robert Williams, U.S. Air Force
1964 - Will Cross, Portland, Oregon
1965 - George Cooper, Oakland, California
1966 - Martino Berzewski, San Antonio, Texas
1967 - Len Hutchins, Detroit, Michigan
1968 - Al Jones, Detroit, Michigan
1969 - Larry Ward, Milwaukee, Wisconsin
1970 - John Magnum, Michigan
1971 - Joey Hadley, Memphis, Tennessee
1972 - Mike Colbert, Portland, Oregon
1973 - Marvin Hagler, Brockton, Massachusetts
1974 - Vonzell Johnson, Columbus, Ohio
1975 - Tommy Brooks, U.S. Air Force
1976 - Keith Broom, U.S. Navy
1977 - Jerome Bennett, U.S. Air Force
1978 - Jeff McCracken, U.S. Marines
1979 - Alex Ramos, Bronx, New York
1980 - Martin Pierce, Flint, Michigan
1981 - Michael Grogan, Atlanta, Georgia
1982 - Michael Grogan, Atlanta, Georgia
1983 - Michael Grogan, Atlanta, Georgia
1984 - Percy Harris, Baltimore, Maryland
1985 - Darin Allen, Columbus, Ohio
1986 - Anthony Hembrick, U.S. Army
1987 - Anthony Hembrick, U.S. Army
1988 - Jerome James, Sioux Falls, SD
1989 - Ray Lathon, St. Louis, Missouri
1990 - Michael DeMoss, U.S. Marines
1991 - Chris Byrd, Flint, Michigan
1992 - Chris Byrd, Flint, Michigan
1993 - Eric Wright, U.S. Army
1994 - Shane Swartz, Fort Collins, Colorado
1995 - Shane Swartz, Fort Collins, Colorado
1996 - Omar Sheika, Paterson, New Jersey
1997 - Jorge Hawley, Fontana, California
1998 - Jeff Lacy, St. Petersburg, Florida
1999 - Arthur Palac, Hamtramck, Michigan
2000 - Matt Godfrey, Providence, Rhode Island
2001 - Andre Ward, Oakland, California
2002 - Julius Fogle, Fort Carson, Colorado
2003 - Andre Dirrell, Flint, Michigan
2004 - James Johnson, Converse, Texas
2005 - Edwin Rodriguez, Worcester, Massachusetts
2006 - Daniel Jacobs, Brooklyn
2007 - Fernando Guerrero, Salisbury, Maryland
2008 - Luis Arias, Milwaukee, WI
2009 - Terrell Gausha, Cleveland, OH
2010 - Saul Jr Jimenez, Oklahoma City, Ok
2011 - Chris Pearson, Trotwood, OH
2012 - Terrell Gausha, Cleveland, OH

Middle